Stute is a surname. Notable people with the surname include:

Melvin F. Stute (1927–2020), American trainer of Thoroughbred racehorses
Warren Stute (1921–2007), American Thoroughbred horse racing trainer

See also
Stutes